Tornaco Castle is a castle in Vervoz, in the municipality of Clavier, Belgium.

See also
List of castles in Belgium

Castles in Belgium